The Belgium women's national rugby union team are a national sporting side of Belgium, representing them at rugby union. The side first played in 1986.

History
Belgium played their first international test against Sweden on 29 October 1986, they were defeated 32–0 in Brussels. They registered their biggest win of 73–0 in 2007 when they thrashed Luxembourg.

Belgium competed in the 2022–23 Rugby Europe Women's Trophy competition. They were beaten 71–5 in their first match against Portugal in Brussels. They also lost their second match to the Czech Republic 29–21 in Prague.

Results summary
 (Full internationals only)

References

External links
 Belgian Rugby Federation - Official Site

European national women's rugby union teams
Rugby union in Belgium
R